Ron Johnson (June 8, 1956 – July 10, 2018) was an American professional football cornerback. He played seven seasons in the National Football League (NFL) for the Pittsburgh Steelers.

Biography
Johnson was a 1974 graduate of Detroit's Northwestern High School; he played collegiate football for Eastern Michigan University. Ron Johnson was selected by the Steelers in the first-round of the 1978 NFL draft.

References

1956 births
2018 deaths
Players of American football from Detroit
American football cornerbacks
Eastern Michigan Eagles football players
Pittsburgh Steelers players
Eastern Michigan University alumni
Northwestern High School (Michigan) alumni